The Black Mesa and Lake Powell Railroad  was an electrified private railroad operating in Northern Arizona, USA within the Navajo Nation which transported coal  from the Peabody Energy Kayenta Mine near Kayenta, Arizona to the Navajo Generating Station power plant at Page, Arizona. It was completely isolated from the national rail network and did not connect to any other railroad. As a result, like metros, light rails, and trams, it was not controlled by the Federal Railroad Administration.

The line was constructed in the early 1970s and was the first railroad to be electrified at 50,000 volts. It was owned by the Salt River Project and the co-owners of the Navajo Generating Station.

Operation
The line was electrified by means of 50,000 V, 60 Hz, overhead catenary with electricity supplied by the Navajo Tribal Utility Authority.

During normal operations, the railroad operated three round trips per day. Between 1973 and 1976, six E60CFs locomotives were purchased new. In 1975, the company took delivery of two Morrison–Knudsen TE70-4S units. The only diesels on the railway would be scrapped by the mid-1990s.

In 1999, some 1982/83 built E60C-2s were purchased from Ferrocarriles Nacionales de México and overhauled including conversion from 25 kV.

Forty new aluminum coal hoppers were purchased from FreightCar America to replace some of the aging fleet of 30 year-old FMC and Ortner hoppers.

The railroad's final delivery to the Navajo Generating Station was August 26, 2019. The power plant was shut down in December 2019 due to competition from cheaper energy sources.

The electrical components of the railway were dismantled between winter 2019 and fall 2020, but the tracks have remained in place to be evaluated for future use.

See also 

 List of Arizona railroads
 Mine railway
 Navajo Mine Railroad - another (formerly electric) railroad on Navajo land
 Deseret Power Railroad - another electric railroad servicing a power plant in Colorado and Utah

References

External links 

 
 

Arizona railroads
Electric railways in Arizona
Railway lines opened in 1973
Railway lines closed in 2019
1973 establishments in Arizona
2019 disestablishments in Arizona
Mining railways in the United States